Camp Moore, north of the Village of Tangipahoa near Kentwood, Louisiana, was a Confederate training base and principal base of operations in eastern Louisiana and southwestern Mississippi.  The base was named for Louisiana Governor Thomas Overton Moore. It operated from May 1861 to 1864 during the American Civil War. Confederate monuments were erected at the cemetery and on the grounds in the early 20th century.

This location was chosen for development of the camp due to its relatively high ground elevation, abundance of fresh drinking water, and nearness to the then New Orleans, Jackson & Great Northern Railroad line.

A small portion of the camp remains, containing the Camp Moore Confederate Cemetery and Museum. The state built the museum at the site in 1965, which displays and interprets area Confederate history. The site was listed on the National Register of Historic Places in 1979. It is still owned by the state, but is operated under lease by a private non-profit.

Overview 

Confederate President Jefferson Davis authorized establishment of Camp Moore. It was developed near a railroad line for ready access to transportation for troops, supplies and equipment.

The thousands of troops who were organized and trained at Camp Moore included the regiments that later constituted the Louisiana Tigers from Calcasieu Parish.  As many as 20,000 men from Louisiana were trained at Camp Moore before fighting in battles in Kentucky, Virginia, Tennessee, and Arkansas.  Troops from Mississippi and Arkansas were also trained at the base.

Many of the Confederate soldiers buried in the cemetery died of various diseases. In the center of the cemetery stands a monument which was dedicated in 1907.

The log house was built in 1929, as a chapter house for Chapter No. 562 of the United Daughters of the Confederacy.  Next to the log house stands a monument to area Confederate soldiers, which was dedicated in 1979.

Built in 1965 and designated as a State Commemorative Area, the museum contains artifacts from the Civil War and regional history.  In 1986, Governor Edwards closed the site, along with other commemorative areas across the State, during a state monetary crunch.

The site is still owned by the Louisiana Office of State Lands; a private, non-profit entity, the Camp Moore Historical Association, was formed to preserve and operate the site. It made a 97-year lease with the State of Louisiana, and reopened the site in June 1993.

The Museum is open to the public for tours, Wednesday through Saturday 10:00 am to 3:00 pm, and closed on major holidays. An annual Civil War re-enactment is held annually on the weekend before Thanksgiving. This two-day event, held on Saturday and Sunday, features scripted battles, living history displays, and memorial ceremonies.

Gallery

References

External links 

 
 Listing of visible marked burials
 National Park Service Page
 
 
 

American Civil War army posts
American Civil War museums in Louisiana
Buildings and structures in Tangipahoa Parish, Louisiana
Cemeteries in Louisiana
Confederate States of America cemeteries
Louisiana in the American Civil War
Louisiana Tigers
Museums in Tangipahoa Parish, Louisiana
Military facilities on the National Register of Historic Places in Louisiana
Protected areas of Tangipahoa Parish, Louisiana
Confederate States of America monuments and memorials in Louisiana
National Register of Historic Places in Tangipahoa Parish, Louisiana
American Civil War on the National Register of Historic Places
1861 establishments in Louisiana